Misaki Doi and Jessica Pegula were the defending champions, but chose not to participate.

Hayley Carter and Jamie Loeb won the title, defeating Usue Maitane Arconada and Caroline Dolehide in the final, 6–4, 6–4.

Seeds

Draw

Draw

References
Main Draw

Tennis Championships of Honolulu - Doubles
Tennis Championships of Honolulu